Gnolus is a genus of South American orb-weaver spiders that was first described by Eugène Louis Simon in 1879. Originally placed with the orb-weaving spiders, it was transferred to the pirate spiders in 1993, but moved back to orb-weaver family in 2012.

Species
 it contains six species, found in Argentina and Chile:
Gnolus angulifrons Simon, 1896 – Chile, Argentina
Gnolus blinkeni Platnick & Shadab, 1993 – Chile, Argentina
Gnolus cordiformis (Nicolet, 1849) (type) – Chile, Argentina
Gnolus limbatus (Nicolet, 1849) – Chile
Gnolus spiculator (Nicolet, 1849) – Chile, Argentina
Gnolus zonulatus Tullgren, 1902 – Chile, Argentina

In synonymy:
G. affinis Tullgren, 1902 = Gnolus cordiformis (Nicolet, 1849)

See also
 List of Araneidae species: G-M

References

Araneidae
Araneomorphae genera
Spiders of South America